Vega de Alatorre  is a municipality located in the central zone in the State of Veracruz, about 60 km from the state capital, Xalapa. It has an area of 310.92 km2.

In 2017, the total population of the municipality of Vega de Alatorre was 20,490.

Geography
The municipality of  Vega de Alatorre  is bordered to the north by Nautla, to the east by Gulf of Mexico, to the south by Juchique de Ferrer and Alto Lucero de Gutiérrez Barrios and to the west by Misantla.

Economy
It produces principally maize, beans, watermelon, green chile, banana, and orange fruit.

Notable people
Rafael Hernández Ochoa, Governor of Veracruz from 1974-1980.

References

External links 

  Municipal Official webpage
  Municipal Official Information

Municipalities of Veracruz